Pedda Orampadu is a village in Obulavaripalle mandal, Kadapa District, Andhra Pradesh, India.

References

Villages in Kadapa district